Jiangsu Tongzhou High School is a senior high school in Nantong, Jiangsu, China, located in Tongzhou area.

History
Jiangsu Tongzhou High School was established in 1923 and has the history of eighty eight years till now. In 1980, it won the Key High School title. In 2004, it became a member of Four-Star schools of Jiangsu.http://gaokao.chsi.com.cn/zx/sch/zxgkinfo.action?id=178385263

Scale
It covers about 150,000 square meters and the building area takes up about fifty thousand square meters. There are 70 classes and 4000 students totally. Besides, there is a group of 218 specialized teachers, including two professorial grade senior teachers and seven special grade teachers. Like other high schools it's a common high school. In addition, it includes a teenager sports school which introduces about 40 talented students to the national and provincial track and field team. The school is also equipped with modern facilities such as scientific building, arts building, sports center, library and so on. They bring the benefits to students' and teachers' activities.

Culture
Jiangsu Tongzhou High School regards "Masanori Ministry of Health and Welfare" as its motto. Every teacher sets up the idea that one must take each student into consideration and help each of them to achieve success. To firmly promote the quality education it treats reformation as the aim, scientific research as the guide and cooperation as the base. Furthermore, it attaches importance to students' mental education, and established the mentally healthy magazine called "Heart Spring" and the newspaper named "Mentally Healthy Reading". Its mental education was awarded the name "Four-Star Mental Training Center" by Nantong Education Bureau.

Reputation
 National Exemplary Senior High School
 Four-Star Senior High School in Jiangsu
 Green High School in Jiangsu
 Teenager Olympic Competition Training Base
 Teenager Olympic Sports Club
 The source of good students for Nanjing University
 The High School Affiliated to Southeast University

References
 

1923 establishments in China
Educational institutions established in 1923
High schools in Jiangsu
Nantong